The New Archies is an American animated sitcom produced by DIC Animation City, based upon the characters by Archie Comics. The series, originally produced for NBC's Saturday morning schedule and broadcast from September 12 to December 5, 1987, depicted the characters of Archie Andrews, Betty Cooper, Veronica Lodge, Jughead Jones, Reggie Mantle, and other students of Riverdale High School as pre-teens in junior high.

Archie produced an identically named and themed comic book series that ran alongside the animated series.

In the series, Veronica uses the dialect of an archetypal valley girl. In the animated series produced by Filmation and the radio show, she had a southern accent. Dilton Doiley did not appear on The New Archies, and was replaced by an African American child named Eugene. Eugene's girlfriend Amani was also introduced in The New Archies, as was Archie's dog, Red.

Cast
 J. Michael Roncetti as Archie Andrews
 Lisa Coristine as Betty Cooper
 Alyson Court as Veronica Lodge
 Michael Fantini as Jughead Jones
 Sunny Besen Thrasher as Reggie Mantle
 Marvin Goldhar as Mr. Weatherbee
 Colin Waterman as Eugene
 Greg Swanson as Coach
 Karen Burthwright as Amani
 Victor Erdos as Big Moose
 Jazzmin Lausanne as Big Ethel
 Linda Sorenson as Miss Grundy

Episodes
"The Visitor" / "Ballot Box Blues" – September 12, 1987: written by Kimmer Ringwald
"The Last Laugh" / "Thief of Hearts" – September 19, 1987: written by Kimmer Ringwald (The Last Laugh), Jon Cohen (Thief of Hearts)
"I Gotta Be Me or Is It You?" / "Sir Jughead Jones" – September 26, 1987: written by Jon Cohen (I Gotta Be Me or Is It You?), Kimmer Ringwald (Sir Jughead Jones)
"The Awful Truth" / "Jughead Predicts" – October 3, 1987: written by Scott Anderson (The Awful Truth), Eleanor Burian-Mohr and Jack Hanrahan (Jughead Predicts)
"Future Shock" / "Stealing the Show" – October 10, 1987: written by Scott Anderson (Future Shock), Herb Engelhardt (Stealing the Show)
"Hamburger Helpers" / "Goodby Ms. Grundy" – October 17, 1987: written by Pat Allee and Ben Hurst (Hamburger Helpers), Herb Engelhardt (Goodby Ms. Grundy)
"Red to the Rescue" / "Jughead the Jinx" – October 24, 1987: written by Eleanor Burian-Mohr and Jack Hanrahan (Red to the Rescue), Pat Allee and Ben Hurst (Jughead the Jinx)
"Telegraph, Telephone, Tell Reggie" / "Wooden It Be Loverly" – October 31, 1987: written by Eleanor Burian-Mohr and Jack Hanrahan
"I Was a 12 Year Old Werewolf" / "The Prince of Riverdale" – November 7, 1987: written by Dennis O’Flaherty
"Loose Lips Stops Slips" / "A Change of Minds" – November 14, 1987: written by Eleanor Burian-Mohr and Jack Hanrahan (Loose Lips Stops Slips), Gary Greenfield (A Change of Minds)
"Incredible Shrinking Archie" / "Gunk for Gold" – November 21, 1987: written by Gary Greenfield (Incredible Shrinking Archie), Eleanor Burian-Mohr and Jack Hanrahan (Gunk for Gold)
"Jughead's Millions" / "Making of Mr. Righteous" – November 28, 1987: written by Gary Greenfield (Jughead’s Millions), Pat Allee and Ben Hurst (Making of Mr. Righteous)
"Take My Butler, Please" / "Horray for Hollywood"  – December 5, 1987: written by Gary Greenfield (Take My Butler, Please), Pat Allee and Ben Hurst (Horray for Hollywood)

References

External links
 

1987 American television series debuts
1987 American television series endings
1980s American animated television series
1980s American sitcoms
American animated sitcoms
American animated television spin-offs
American children's animated comedy television series
American prequel television series
Animated television series about children
Child versions of cartoon characters
English-language television shows
NBC original programming
Television series by Claster Television
Television series by DIC Entertainment
Television series by Saban Entertainment
Television shows based on Archie Comics